This is a list of football (soccer) stadiums in Ethiopia, ranked in descending order of capacity with at least 5,000 Spectators. Some stadiums are football-specific and some are used for other proposes.

Existing stadiums

Under Construction Stadiums

See also 
List of association football stadiums by capacity
List of African stadiums by capacity

References

External links 

 
Ethiopia
Football in Ethiopia
Football stadiums